Tributaries of the Missouri River, a major river in the central United States, are listed in upstream order. These lists are arranged into river sections between cities or mouths of major tributaries for ease of navigation. Two large tributaries (the Platte and Yellowstone) have their own separate lists because they would be too lengthy to include in part of another section.

Data is derived from U.S. Geological Survey (USGS) topographical maps and the USGS National Map.

Table of primary tributaries

Mouth to Kansas City
Gasconade River
Big Piney River
Spring Creek
Roubidoux Creek
Osage Fork Gasconade River
Beaver Creek
Auxvasse Creek
Osage River
Maries River
Niangua River
Little Niangua River
Greasy Creek
Pomme de Terre River
Little Pomme de Terre River
South Grand River
Tebo Creek
Big Creek
Weaubleau Creek
Sac River
Little Sac River
Turnback Creek
Clear Creek
Little Osage River
Marmaton River
Marais des Cygnes River
Bull Creek
Pottawatomie Creek
Moreau River
North Moreau Creek
South Moreau Creek
Cedar Creek
Moniteau Creek
Perche Creek
Lamine River
Blackwater River
Salt Fork Blackwater River
Heaths Creek
Muddy Creek
Richland Creek
Flat Creek
Haw Creek
Little Chariton River
Middle Fork Little Chariton River
East Fork Little Chariton River
Chariton River
Mussel Fork Chariton River
Walnut Creek
Blackbird Creek
Grand River
Locust Creek
Medicine Creek
Thompson River
Honey Creek
Weldon River
Shoal Creek
Big Creek
Grindstone Creek
East Fork Grand River
Middle Fork Grand River
Fishing River
East Fork Fishing River
Little Blue River
Blue River
Indian Creek
Coffee Creek
Wolf Creek

Kansas City to Plattsmouth
Kansas River
Wakarusa River
Delaware River
Soldier Creek
Big Blue River
Fancy Creek
Little Blue River
Mill Creek
Turkey Creek
West Fork Big Blue River
Republican River
White Rock Creek
Prairie Dog Creek
Sappa Creek
Beaver Creek
Medicine Creek
Red Willow Creek
Frenchman River
Stinking Water Creek
South Fork Republican River
North Fork Republican River
Arikaree River
Smoky Hill River
Solomon River
North Fork Solomon River
Cedar Creek
Beaver Creek
Bow Creek
South Fork Solomon River
Covert Creek
Medicine Creek
Saline River
Mulberry Creek
Spillman Creek
Wolf Creek
Big Timber Creek
North Fork Smoky Hill River
Platte River
Little Platte River
Third Fork Platte River
Nodaway River
East Nodaway River
West Nodaway River
Middle Nodaway River
Wolf River
Big Nemaha River
Muddy Creek
North Fork Big Nemaha River
South Fork Big Nemaha River
Tarkio River
Little Nemaha River
South Fork Little Nemaha River
Nishnabotna River
West Nishnabotna River
Walnut Creek
East Nishnabotna River
Weeping Water Creek
Keg Creek
James Creek

Platte River Basin
Platte River (Missouri River)
Salt Creek
Oak Creek
Stevens Creek
Middle Creek
Antelope Creek
Elk Creek
Beal Slough
Haines Branch
Cardwell Branch
Lynn Creek
Deadman's Run
Little Salt Creek
Elkhorn River
Maple Creek
Logan Creek
North Fork Elkhorn River
Cache Creek
South Fork Elkhorn River
Shell Creek
Loup River
Cedar River
North Loup River
Calamus River
Goose Creek
Middle Loup River
South Loup River
Mud Creek
Dismal River
South Branch Middle Loup River
Middle Branch Middle Loup River
North Branch Middle Loup River
Prairie Creek
Wood River
Buffalo Creek
North Platte River
Birdwood Creek
Blue Creek
Rush Creek
Horse Creek
Cherry Creek
Box Elder Creek
Rawhide Creek
Laramie River
North Laramie River
Chugwater Creek
Richeau Creek
Sybille Creek
Fourmile Creek
Little Laramie River
Sand Creek
Horseshoe Creek
La Bonte Creek
La Prele Creek
Casper Creek
Bates Creek
Sweetwater River
Sage Hen Creek
Long Creek
Willow Creek
Little Sweetwater River
East Sweetwater River
Sage Creek
Medicine Bow River
Little Medicine Bow River
Rock Creek
Wagonhound Creek
Pass Creek
Encampment River
North Fork Encampment River
Douglas Creek
Pinkham Creek
Canadian River
Michigan River
Illinois River
Owl Creek
South Fork Michigan River
North Fork North Platte River
Roaring Fork North Platte River
Grizzly Creek
Buffalo Creek
Little Grizzly Creek
South Platte River
Lodgepole Creek
Muddy Creek
Cottonwood Creek
Beaver Creek
Bijou Creek
East Bijou Creek
West Bijou Creek
Kiowa Creek
Box Elder Creek
Cache La Poudre River
South Fork Cache La Poudre River
Big Thompson River
Little Thompson River
Dry Creek
North Fork Big Thompson River
St. Vrain River
Boulder Creek
Left Hand Creek
Clear Creek
North Clear Creek
Cherry Creek
Bear Creek
Deer Creek
Plum Creek
North Fork South Platte River
Craig Creek
Horse Creek
Tarryall Creek
Middle Fork South Platte River
South Fork South Platte River

Plattsmouth to Pierre
Mosquito Creek
Boyer River
Willow River
East Boyer River
Soldier River
East Soldier River
Middle Soldier River
Little Sioux River
Maple River
Elk Creek
West Fork Little Sioux River
Mill Creek
Ocheyedan River
Little Ocheyedan River
Floyd River
West Branch Floyd River
Little Floyd River
Perry Creek
Big Sioux River
Rock River
Little Rock River
East Branch Rock River
Beaver Creek
Split Rock Creek
Silver Creek
Flandreau Creek
Medary Creek
Indian River
Vermillion River
James River
Wolf Creek
Pierre Creek
Rock Creek
Shue Creek
Timber Creek
Snake Creek
Mud Creek
Elm River
Pipestem River
Kelly Creek
Bazile Creek
Niobrara River
Verdigre Creek
Redbird Creek
Eagle Creek
Keya Paha River
Shadley Creek
Plum Creek
Minnechaduza Creek
Snake River
Steer Creek
Bear Creek
Leander Creek
Rush Creek
Pine Creek
Butte Creek
Ponca Creek
Choteau Creek
Garden Creek
Platte Creek
White River
White Thunder Creek
Little White River
Pine Creek
Cut Meat Creek
Black Pipe Creek
Porcupine Creek
Potato Creek
Wounded Knee Creek
American Creek
Crow Creek
Knoll Creek
Bad River
War Creek
White Clay Creek
Dry Creek
Mitchell Creek
North Fork Bad River
South Fork Bad River

Pierre to Bismarck
Okobojo Creek
Cheyenne River
Cherry Creek
Belle Fourche River
Alkali Creek
Bear Butte Creek
Whitewood Creek
Redwater River
Spearfish Creek
Blacktail Creek
Kara Creek
Elk Creek
Boxelder Creek
Rapid Creek
Spring Creek
Battle Creek
French Creek
Beaver Creek
Horsehead Creek
Cascade Creek
Hat Creek
Red Canyon Creek
Lance Creek
Black Thunder Creek
Little Thunder Creek
Antelope Creek
Dry Fork Cheyenne River
Moreau River
Virgin Creek
Little Moreau River
Red Earth Creek
Bear Creek
Irish Creek
Thunder Butte Creek
Deep Creek
Beverly Creek
North Fork Moreau River
South Fork Moreau River
Battle Creek
Grand River
High Bank Creek
Firesteel Creek
Black Horse Butte Creek
Thunder Hawk Creek
Willow Creek
North Fork Grand River
Buffalo Creek
Lightning Creek
Spring Creek
South Fork Grand River
Flat Creek
Lodgepole Creek
Big Nasty Creek
Skull Creek
Oak Creek
Fourmile Creek
Porcupine Creek
Beaver Creek
Cannonball River
Cantapeta Creek
Dogtooth Creek
Cedar Creek
Hay Creek
Brushy Creek
Duck Creek
Snake Creek
Morris Creek
Sheep Creek
Thirtymile Creek
Apple Creek
Heart River
Sweetbriar Creek
Big Muddy Creek
Haymarsh Creek
Antelope Creek
Heart Butte Creek
Green River
Ash Creek
South Branch Heart River

Bismarck to Williston
Burnt Creek
Painted Woods Creek
Turtle Creek
Knife River
Spring Creek
Elm Creek
Deep Creek
Crooked Creek
Little Knife River
Garrison Creek
Douglas Creek (submerged under Lake Sakakawea)
East Branch Douglas Creek
Middle Branch Douglas Creek
West Branch Douglas Creek
Little Missouri River
Cherry Creek
Rough Creek
Crosby Creek
Beicegel Creek
Beaver Creek
Elk Creek
Knutson Creek
Davis Creek
Sand Creek
Deep Creek
West Fork Deep Creek
East Fork Deep Creek
Cannonball Creek
Beaver Creek
Boxelder Creek
Cabin Creek
Willow Creek
North Fork Little Missouri River
Prairie Creek
Shell Creek
East Fork Shell Creek
West Shell Creek
Bear Den Creek
Little Knife River
White Earth River
Paulsen Creek
Little Muddy River

Yellowstone River Basin
Yellowstone River
Charbonneau Creek
Horse Creek
Fox Creek
Burns Creek
Box Elder Creek
Clear Creek
Cedar Creek
O'Fallon Creek
Sandstone Creek
Powder River
Mispah Creek
Little Powder River
Clear Creek
Buffalo Creek
Piney Creek
Little Piney Creek
Rock Creek
French Creek
Wild Horse Creek
Crazy Woman Creek
South Fork Crazy Woman Creek
Middle Fork Crazy Woman Creek
North Fork Crazy Woman Creek
Dry Fork Powder River
Salt Creek
South Fork Powder River
North Fork Powder River
Middle Fork Powder River
Red Fork Powder River
Buffalo Creek
Tongue River
Pumpkin Creek
Ash Creek
Foster Creek
Lay Creek
Liscom Creek
Beaver Creek
Otter Creek
Hanging Woman Creek
Prairie Dog Creek
Goose Creek
Soldier Creek
Big Goose Creek
Little Goose Creek
Wolf Creek
Rosebud Creek
Little Rosebud Creek
West Rosebud Creek
Lame Deer Creek
Muddy Creek
Davis Creek
Armells Creek
East Fork Armells Creek
West Fork Armells Creek
Sarpy Creek
Bighorn River
Tullock Creek
Little Bighorn River
Beauvais Creek
Rotten Grass Creek
Soap Creek
Porcupine Creek
Crooked Creek
Shoshone River
Sage Creek
Spring Creek
North Fork Shoshone River
Elk Fork Shoshone River
South Fork Shoshone River
Dry Creek
Shell Creek
Beaver Creek
Greybull River
Meeteetse Creek
Wood River
South Fork Wood River
Francs Fork Greybull River
Nowood River
Paint Rock Creek
Tensleep Creek
Otter Creek
Deep Creek
Fifteenmile Creek
Middle Fork Fifteenmile Creek
South Fork Fifteenmile Creek
Nowater Creek
Gooseberry Creek
Cottonwood Creek
Grass Creek
Prospect Creek
Kirby Creek
Owl Creek
Wind River
Muddy Creek
Badwater Creek
Poison Creek
Fivemile Creek
Muskrat Creek
Little Wind River
Beaver Creek
Popo Agie River
North Popo Agie River
Middle Popo Agie River
Little Popo Agie River
Sage Creek
South Fork Little Wind River
North Fork Little Wind River
Dry Creek
Bull Lake Creek
Crow Creek
Dinwoody Creek
East Fork Wind River
Wiggins Fork Wind River
Horse Creek
Du Noir Creek
Fly Creek
Arrow Creek
Pryor Creek
Hay Creek
Blue Creek
Clarks Fork Yellowstone River
Rock Creek
Red Lodge Creek
Bear Creek
Bennett Creek
O'Hara Creek
Sunlight Creek
Crandall Creek
Stillwater River
Rosebud Creek
West Rosebud Creek
East Rosebud Creek
Limestone Creek
Sweet Grass Creek
Otter Creek
Boulder River
West Boulder River
East Boulder River
East Fork Boulder River
Big Timber Creek
Swamp Creek
Duck Creek
Shields River
Rock Creek
Cottonwood Creek
Flathead Creek
Gardiner River
Lava Creek
Winter Creek
Obsidian Creek
Hellroaring Creek
Lamar River
Slough Creek
Soda Butte Creek
Cache Creek
Miller Creek
Tower Creek
Raven Creek
Thorofare Creek
North Fork Yellowstone River
South Fork Yellowstone River

North Dakota-Montana Border to Great Falls
Little Muddy Creek
Big Muddy Creek
Smoke Creek
Lake Creek
Poplar River
Boxelder Creek
West Fork Poplar River
Police Creek
Hell Creek
Butte Creek
Middle Fork Poplar River
Lost Child Creek
Coal Creek
East Fork Poplar River
Wolf Creek
Little Porcupine Creek
Milk River
Porcupine Creek
Middle Fork Porcupine Creek
Willow Creek
Rock Creek
Willow Creek
Snake Creek
Beaver Creek
Frenchman Creek
Whitewater Creek
Little Cottonwood Creek
Cottonwood Creek
Black Coulee
Woody Island Coulee
Battle Creek
East Fork Battle Creek
Lodge Creek
Clear Creek
Boxelder Creek
Big Sandy Creek
Sage Creek
Verdigris Coulee
North Fork Milk River
Lonely Valley Creek
Middle Fork Milk River
South Fork Milk River
Big Dry Creek
Woody Creek
Little Dry Creek
Musselshell River
Flatwillow Creek
Box Elder Creek
McDonald Creek
Elk Creek
American Fork Musselshell River
South Fork Musselshell River
North Fork Musselshell River
Armells Creek
Cow Creek
Birch Creek
Judith River
Wolf Creek
Dry Wolf Creek
Warm Springs Creek
Sage Creek
Big Spring Creek
Louse Creek
Ross Fork Creek
Middle Fork Judith River
Lost Fork Judith River
South Fork Judith River
Arrow Creek
Cowboy Creek
Surprise Creek
Marias River
Teton River
Deep Creek
Willow Creek
Pondera Coulee
Willow Creek
Dry Fork Marias River
Cut Bank Creek
Greasewood Creek
Two Medicine River
Birch Creek
Dupuyer Creek
Badger Creek
Highwood Creek
Belt Creek

Great Falls to Three Forks
Sun River
Muddy Creek
Elk Creek
North Fork Sun River
South Fork Sun River
West Fork Sun River
Smith River
Hound Creek
Tenderfoot Creek
Whitetail Deer Creek
Dearborn River
South Fork Dearborn River
Middle Fork Dearborn River
Cuniff Creek
Little Prickly Pear Creek
Prickly Pear Creek
Tenmile Creek
Deep Creek
Crow Creek
Sixteen Mile Creek
South Fork Sixteen Mile Creek
Middle Fork Sixteen Mile Creek

Headwaters
Gallatin River
East Gallatin River
Dry Creek
Bridger Creek
Hyalite Creek
Spanish Creek
Storm Castle Creek
West Fork Gallatin River
Taylor Creek
Madison River
Cedar Creek
Ruby Creek
West Fork Madison River
Lake Creek
Elk River
Duck Creek
South Fork Madison River
Firehole River
Little Firehole River
Gibbon River
Jefferson River
South Boulder River
Boulder River
Little Boulder River
Whitetail Deer Creek
Big Pipestone Creek
Fish Creek
Big Hole River
Divide Creek
Wise River
Pettengill Creek
North Fork Big Hole River
Big Lake Creek
Governor Creek
Beaverhead River
Ruby River
Granite Creek
Sweetwater Creek
Blacktail Deer Creek
Rattlesnake Creek
Grasshopper Creek
Horse Prairie Creek
Trail Creek
Red Rock River
Sage Creek
Junction Creek
Long Creek
Odell Creek
Red Rock Creek
Hell Roaring Creek
Brower's Spring

References

See also 
List of tributaries of the Mississippi River

Rivers of the United States
Missouri River
Missouri